The Australian Solo Championship is a motorcycle speedway championship held each year to determine the Australian national champion. It is organised by Motorcycling Australia (MA) and is the oldest continuously running national speedway championship in the world having been run since 1926 with the exception of 1942-1945 when racing was suspended during World War II and 1955-1961 when the championship was not held.

The first Australian Solo Championship in 1926 was held at the Newcastle Showground in Newcastle. It was won by American rider Cecil Brown from Mick Brennan and Roy Hindle.

Legendary Danish rider Ole Olsen (1976) and Australia's own Jason Crump (2007) are the only riders who have won the championship while being the reigning Speedway World Champion. Olsen's controversial win at the Liverpool Speedway in Sydney in 1976 was the last win by a non-Australian rider. His win was controversial as many of the riders at the meeting protested his eligibility because of his nationality. However, with Olsen available to ride the promoters of the speedway insisted on his inclusion knowing that he would draw a larger crowd.

The winner of the Australian Solo Championship receives the Billy Sanders Memorial Trophy named after the speedway rider Billy Sanders (1955–1985).

Winners since 1926

No third place is listed with two or more riders tied for second place. Additionally, with only one rider listed in second, third place was unknown♦ 1990 ride-ff after top 2 tied on 14pts. 1998 ride-off after top 3 placings tied on 13pts# Riders tied on points required ride-off for second and third placeAll titles from 1962 to 1967 were determined by a single race. Titles from 1968 to 2003 decided on the traditional single meeting. From 1999 to 2003 a final for the top 4 point scorers was institutedSince 2004 all titles have been over a 3, 4 or 5 round series

See also

Motorsport in Australia

Notes
 Eleven non-Australian riders have won the championship. Cecil Brown (USA) in 1926, Arthur Atkinson (England) in 1930 (2 miles), Ray Tauscher (USA) in 1931 (6 laps), Larry Boulton (England) in 1933, Jack Milne (USA) in 1937, Jack Parker (England) in 1938, 1950, 1951 [x2], Cordy Milne (USA) in 1938, Bill Kitchen (England) in 1950, Mike Broadbank (England) in 1963, Ken McKinlay (Scotland) in 1964, and Ole Olsen (Denmark) in 1976.
 In the early years of the championship, multiple Australian titles were often held in the same year with some riders winning more than one title per year. Championships were run over anywhere from 2 to 6 laps and/or over 2 miles, often depending on the length of the track used.
 Both Ole Olsen (1976) and Jason Crump (2007) were the reigning Speedway World Champions when they won their Australian titles. Jack Milne of the USA won the 1937 Australian Championship and later that year won the 1937 World Championship. Bluey Wilkinson won the 3 & 4 Lap Australian Championships in 1938 before also going on to win the World Championship later that year, Chris Holder also won both the 2012 Australian and World Championships.
 Speedway World Champions to have won the Australian championship include Bluey Wilkinson (1935, 1938 [3 & 4 Laps]), Jack Milne (1937), Ole Olsen (1976), Jason Crump (1995, 2007) and Chris Holder (2008, 2010, 2011, 2012 & 2014).
 Leigh Adams was the reigning Under-21 World Champion when he won his second straight Australian title in 1993. Jason Crump would win his first Australian title in 1995 and later that year won the 1995 U/21 World Championship.
 Adams also became the first reigning Australian Under-21 Champion to win the senior title when he won his first championship in 1992. Chris Holder became just the second rider to hold both titles at the same time in 2008
 Phil and Jason Crump are the only father/son combination to win the Australian Solo Championship.
 Billy Sanders holds the record for most title wins in a row, winning four in a row from 1980 to 1983. Sanders also won in 1978 and 1985 giving him 6 titles in 8 years, but lost his title in both 1979 and 1984 to Phil Crump. Vic Duggan (1941, 1947, 1948 [x3]) and Chris Holder (2008, 2010, 2011, 2012, 2014) have both won 5 Australian Championships.
 Leigh Adams holds the record for most title wins overall with 10. Aub Lawson holds the record for most podiums with 19 between 1947 and 1954. Lawson's total includes his record of 4 wins in the Champion of Champions (1950, 1952, 1953 and 1954) and his second place in the 1951 Champion of Champions.
 Mildura rider Jason Lyons holds the dubious record of having finished second the most number of times (5 - 1993, 1994, 1998, 1999 & 2005) without ever having won the Australian Championship.
 The winner receives the Billy Sanders Memorial Trophy in honour of the Sydney rider who tragically took his own life on 23 April 1985 just three months after winning his then record 6th championship.

Medals classification

References

Australia
Individual Speedway
Individual Speedway
Speedway
Motorcycle racing series